Friends of Mine is the second solo album by anti-folk musician Adam Green, released on July 22, 2003. It relies heavily on short violin-driven melodramatic pop songs and has a much more polished sound than Garfield, Green's 2002 debut album. A sophomore studio album, the recording is noted for containing vocal stylings that are considered to be a departure from those of Green's previous work (including that of The Moldy Peaches), showcasing a deeper 1960s-influenced spin sound feel to the recording.

Track listing

All songs written by Adam Green, except where noted.

 "Bluebirds" – 2:08
 "Hard to Be a Girl" – 1:41
 "Jessica" – 2:37
 "Musical Ladders" – 2:20
 "The Prince's Bed" – 2:29
 "Bunnyranch" – 1:36
 "Friends of Mine" – 2:49
 "Frozen in Time" (Adam Green, Galen Pehrson) – 2:12
 "Broken Joystick" – 1:24
 "I Wanna Die" – 1:49
 "Salty Candy" – 1:39
 "No Legs" – 2:02
 "We're Not Supposed to Be Lovers" – 3:08
 "Secret Tongues" – 2:09
 "Bungee" – 2:53

Personnel
Adam Green - voice, guitar
Jane Scarpantoni - strings arrangement, cello
Steven Mertens - bass, tambourine, drums, bongos, strings arrangement
Matt Romano - drums
Greg Calbi - engineering
Dan Myers - mixing
David Gold - viola (2)
Antoine Silverman, Joan Wasser - violin

References

2003 albums
Adam Green (musician) albums
Rough Trade Records albums